The Boulevard of Broken Dreams, is a 2002 graphic novel by Kim Deitch. Time chose it as one of their top 10 comics of 2002.

Publication history
The story "The Boulevard of Broken Dreams" originally appeared in Raw Vol. 2, #3.

Works by Kim Deitch
2002 graphic novels